The European Individual Closed Championships (EICC) are the event which serves as the individual European championship for squash players organised by the European Squash Federation. The European Individual Championships was first held in 1990.

Past results

Men's championship

Women's championship

Statistics

Men

Women

See also 
 European Squash Federation
 European Squash Team Championships
 World Open

External links 
 European Squash Federation website Archive Results
 EICC Squash 2012

European championships
Squash in Europe
Squash tournaments
Squash records and statistics